United Nations Security Council Resolution 154, adopted on August 23, 1960, after examining the application of the Central African Republic for membership in the United Nations, the Council recommended to the General Assembly that the Central African Republic be admitted.

The resolution was adopted unanimously.

See also
List of United Nations Security Council Resolutions 101 to 200 (1953–1965)

References
Text of the Resolution at undocs.org

External links
 

 0154
1960 in the Central African Republic
 0154
 0154
August 1960 events